Edward Ashton (19 January 1906 – 1978), was an English footballer who played as an outside left. Born in the mining village of Kilnhurst, Ashton worked in the local pit while playing as a part-time professional for Mexborough Town. Signed by Barnsley for £200 in November 1927, Ashton made his Football League debut in April 1928 against Nottingham Forest and went on to play over 300 games for the Tykes in all competitions. Ashton signed for Sheffield United on a free transfer in October 1936 but was past his best and was unable to hold down a regular first team place. Released in the summer of 1938 he signed with Carlisle United, but with the onset of World War II Ashton enlisted and served in the army before later returning to his job as a miner.

References

1906 births
1978 deaths
People from Kilnhurst
English footballers
Association football forwards
Mexborough Athletic F.C. players
Barnsley F.C. players
Sheffield United F.C. players
Carlisle United F.C. players
English Football League players
Grantham Town F.C. players
British Army personnel of World War II